Sansar Pur is a small town in Lakhimpur Kheri District, Uttar Pradesh.

Demographics
As of 2011 Indian Census, Sansar Pur had a total population of 10,544, of which 5,585 were males and 4,959 were females. Population within the age group of 0 to 6 years was 1718.

References

External links 

Villages in Lakhimpur Kheri district